Twitchell Reservoir is a reservoir in southern San Luis Obispo County and northern Santa Barbara County in California. Twitchell Dam was built by the United States Bureau of Reclamation between 1956 and 1958. The original names were Vacquero Dam and Vacquero Reservoir, but they were changed to honor T. A. Twitchell of Santa Maria, a proponent of the project.

The dam and reservoir provide flood control and water conservation. The water is stored in the reservoir during big winter storms and released as quickly as possible while still allowing it to percolate into the soil and recharge the groundwater. This means that the reservoir is usually far from full. It is estimated that the project increases recharge by  annually. Sedimentation is a problem for the reservoir, as the reservoir is being filled 70 percent faster than expected. This reduces its capacity and blocks the water inlet to the control gates. Some sediment has been removed by flushing it out during releases, but much of it is simply deposited immediately downstream, interfering with flows.

There is no public access to the dam or reservoir.

See also
List of dams and reservoirs in California
List of lakes in California
List of largest reservoirs of California
List of United States Bureau of Reclamation dams

Notes

References
United States Bureau of Reclamation - Santa Maria Project
United States Bureau of Reclamation - Santa Maria Project
United States Army Corps of Engineers - Twitchell Dam
Santa Barbara County Public Works
 

Reservoirs in San Luis Obispo County, California
Reservoirs in Santa Barbara County, California
Dams in California
United States Bureau of Reclamation dams
Dams completed in 1958
Reservoirs in California
Reservoirs in Southern California